Ruslan Vladyslavovych Zubkov (born 24 November 1991) is a Ukrainian professional footballer who plays as a centre-back for Polonia Bytom.

Career 
Zubkov previously played for Chornomorets Odessa youth teams and FC Odessa. In June 2012, he joined to AZAL PFC and signed two years-long contract and was loaned by Turan Tovuz. In December he came back to his club. Zubkov was made a free agent when Araz-Naxçıvan folded and withdrew from the Azerbaijan Premier League on 17 November 2014.

References

External links 

Profile on PFL.az

1991 births
Living people
Footballers from Odesa
Ukrainian footballers
Association football defenders
FC Tytan Armyansk players
FC Dnister Ovidiopol players
AZAL PFK players
Turan-Tovuz IK players
Araz-Naxçıvan PFK players
FC Mariupol players
FC Real Pharma Odesa players
FC Zirka Kropyvnytskyi players
FC Neman Grodno players
FC Lviv players
NK Veres Rivne players
FC Kremin Kremenchuk players
FC Kramatorsk players
FC Ahrobiznes Volochysk players
Ruch Chorzów players
Polonia Bytom players
Ukrainian Premier League players
Ukrainian First League players
Ukrainian Second League players
Ukrainian Amateur Football Championship players
II liga players
Ukrainian expatriate footballers
Expatriate footballers in Azerbaijan
Expatriate footballers in Belarus
Expatriate footballers in Poland
Ukrainian expatriate sportspeople in Azerbaijan
Ukrainian expatriate sportspeople in Belarus
Ukrainian expatriate sportspeople in Poland